Donna Harpauer is a Canadian provincial politician. She was the Saskatchewan Party member of the Legislative Assembly of Saskatchewan for the constituency of Humboldt and won the seat for the new riding of Humboldt-Watrous in the 2020 election.

She was first elected to the Legislative Assembly in the 1999 election, defeating New Democrat incumbent Eric Upshall. In the 2003 election, Watrous was dissolved and Harpauer was re-elected in the new constituency of Humboldt.

Controversies

As the Social Services Minister in 2008, it was later revealed that Harpauer had used private email for government-related manners. In one email she told a former campaign staffer "I will hire you by contract if need be to get around the rules defined by the [Public Service Commission]." In a later email to the same person, she stated "The Public Service Commission is getting all crappy about us hiring people without open competition … Blah … Blah … Blah. Lots of fun.  I really don't care what they think!!" The former staffer said Harpauer told him to use private email because "we wanted to be free from the freedom of information requests."

In 2018, Harpauer was revealed to have twice stayed at a hotel with her partner on personal trips in which the stay was paid for by the village of Pinehouse. Harpauer did not disclose any gifts or benefits for the stays in her personal disclosure statements.

Cabinet positions

References

External links
Donna Harpauer

Living people
Women government ministers of Canada
Members of the Executive Council of Saskatchewan
Year of birth missing (living people)
Saskatchewan Party MLAs
Women MLAs in Saskatchewan
People from Humboldt, Saskatchewan
21st-century Canadian politicians
21st-century Canadian women politicians
Finance ministers of Saskatchewan
Female finance ministers
Deputy premiers of Saskatchewan